The London Guidebook is a 1996 role-playing game supplement published by Chaosium for Call of Cthulhu.

Contents
The London Guidebook is a sourcebook which gives information on London during the Jazz Age.

Reviews
Dragon #235
Arcane (Issue 10 - Sep 1996)
The Unspeakable Oath #14/15 (1997)
Backstab #5

References

Call of Cthulhu (role-playing game) supplements
Role-playing game supplements introduced in 1996